The 129th Ohio Infantry Regiment, sometimes 129th Ohio Volunteer Infantry (or 129th OVI) was an infantry regiment in the Union Army during the American Civil War.

Service
The 129th Ohio Infantry was organized at Camp Cleveland near Cleveland, Ohio, and mustered in August 10, 1863, for six months service under the command of Colonel Howard D. John.

The regiment was attached to DeCourcy's Brigade, Willcox's Left Wing Forces, Department of the Ohio, to October 1863. 3rd Brigade, 2nd Division, IX Corps, Army of the Ohio, to January 1864. District of the Clinch, Department of the Ohio, to March 1864.

The 129th Ohio Infantry mustered out of service at Cleveland, Ohio, on March 11, 1864.

Detailed service
Moved to Camp Nelson, Ky., August 10. Expedition under DeCourcy to Cumberland Gap, Tenn., August 20-September 8, 1863. Capture of Cumberland Gap September 9. Duty at Cumberland Gap picketing and foraging until December 1. March toward Clinch River December 1–2. Patrol duty along Clinch River until December 29. Moved to Tazewell, then to Cumberland Gap, and duty there until January 11, 1864. Ordered to Camp Nelson, Ky. Skirmish at Barbourville, Ky., February 8. Ordered to Cleveland, Ohio, March 1864.

Casualties
The regiment lost 25 enlisted men during service, all due to disease.

Commanders
 Colonel Howard D. John

See also

 List of Ohio Civil War units
 Ohio in the Civil War

References

 Dyer, Frederick H. A Compendium of the War of the Rebellion (Des Moines, IA:  Dyer Pub. Co.), 1908.
 Ohio Roster Commission. Official Roster of the Soldiers of the State of Ohio in the War on the Rebellion, 1861–1865, Compiled Under the Direction of the Roster Commission (Akron, OH: Werner Co.), 1886–1895.
 Reid, Whitelaw. Ohio in the War: Her Statesmen, Her Generals, and Soldiers (Cincinnati, OH: Moore, Wilstach, & Baldwin), 1868.
Attribution

External links
 Ohio in the Civil War: 128th Ohio Volunteer Infantry by Larry Stevens
 Regimental flag of the 129th Ohio Infantry

Military units and formations established in 1863
Military units and formations disestablished in 1864
1864 disestablishments in Ohio
Units and formations of the Union Army from Ohio
1863 establishments in Ohio